Glutamate formimidoyltransferase is a methyltransferase enzyme which uses tetrahydrofolate as part of histidine catabolism. It catalyses two reactions:

 5-formimidoyltetrahydrofolate + L-glutamate <=> tetrahydrofolate + N-formimidoyl-L-glutamate
 5-formyltetrahydrofolate + L-glutamate <=> tetrahydrofolate + N-formyl-L-glutamate

It is classified under  and in mammals is found as part of a bifunctional enzyme that also has formimidoyltetrahydrofolate cyclodeaminase activity.

Structure

The formiminotransferase (FT) domain of formiminotransferase-cyclodeaminase (FTCD) forms a homodimer, with each protomer comprising two subdomains. The formiminotransferase domain has an N-terminal subdomain that is made up of a six-stranded mixed beta-pleated sheet and five alpha helices, which are arranged on the external surface of the beta sheet. This, in turn, faces the beta-sheet of the C-terminal subdomain to form a double beta-sheet layer. The two subdomains are separated by a short linker sequence, which is not thought to be any more flexible than the remainder of the molecule. The substrate is predicted to form a number of contacts with residues found in both the N-terminal and C-terminal subdomains. In humans, deficiency of this enzyme results in a disease phenotype.

References

External links
 

Protein domains
EC 2.1.2